Continuous Media Markup Language (CMML) is to audio or video what HTML is to text. CMML is essentially a timed text codec. It allows file creators to structure a time-continuously sampled data file by dividing it into temporal sections (also called clips), and provides these clips with some additional information. This information is HTML-like and is essentially a textual representation of the audio or video file. CMML enables textual searches on these otherwise binary files.

CMML is appropriate for use with all Ogg media formats, to provide subtitles and timed metadata.

CMML is deprecated; Xiph.Org Foundation recommends use Kate instead.

Example of CMML Content 
<cmml>
  <stream timebase="0">
    <import src="galaxies.ogv" contenttype="video/ogg"/>
  </stream>
  <head>
    <title>Hidden Galaxies</title>
    <meta name="author" content="CSIRO"/>
  </head>
  <clip id="findingGalaxies" start="15">
    <a href="http://www.aao.gov.au/galaxies.anx#radio">
      Related video on detection of galaxies
    </a>
    <img src="galaxy.jpg"/>
    <desc>What's out there?</desc>
    <meta name="KEYWORDS" content="Radio Telescope"/>
  </clip>
</cmml>

References

External links
 CMML Overview
 The origin of the CMML document, along with further documentation and standards can be found at Annodex CMML Standard Version 2.1

Open formats
XML-based standards
Xiph.Org projects
Subtitle file formats